This article serves as an index - as complete as possible - of all the honorific orders or similar decorations received by the Selangor royal family, classified by continent, awarding country and recipient.

They have been awarded :

Sultanate of Selangor 

 Sharafuddin of Selangor :
  Grand Master (since 21 November 2001) and First Class (DK I, 14.3.1970) of the Royal Family Order of Selangor
  Grand Master (since 21 November 2001) and Knight Grand Commander (SPMS, 6.6.1961) of the Order of the Crown of Selangor with title Dato' Seri
  Founding Grand Master and Knight Grand Companion of the Order of Sultan Sharafuddin Idris Shah (SSIS, since 14 December 2002) with title Dato' Setia
  Grand Master of the Order of Sultan Salahuddin Abdul Aziz Shah (since 21 November 2001)
 Tengku Amir Shah, Crown Prince of Selangor : 
  Knight Grand Commander of the Order of the Crown of Selangor  (SPMS, 11.12.2005) with title Dato' Seri 
  Knight Grand Companion of the Order of Sultan Sharafuddin Idris Shah (SSIS, 2010) with title Dato' Setia 
 Tengku Sulaiman Shah, eldest younger brother of Sultan Sharafuddin
  First Class of the Royal Family Order of Selangor (DK I)
  Knight Grand Commander of the Order of the Crown of Selangor  (SPMS, 8.3.1983) with title Dato' Seri
 Tunku Kamariah, Tengku Sulaiman Shah's wife :
  First Class of the Royal Family Order of Selangor (DK I)
 Tengku Abdul Samad Shah, second younger brother of Sultan Sharafuddin
  Knight Grand Companion of t the Order of Sultan Salahuddin Abdul Aziz Shah (SSSA) with title Dato' Seri
 Tengku Ahmad Shah, third younger brother of Sultan Sharafuddin
  Knight Grand Companion of t the Order of Sultan Salahuddin Abdul Aziz Shah (SSSA) with title Dato' Seri
  Knight Commander of the Order of the Crown of Selangor (DPMS) with title Dato'''
 Tengku Nur Zihan, youngest sister of Sultan Sharafuddin
  Knight Grand Companion of the Order of Sultan Sharafuddin Idris Shah (SSIS, 11.12.2002) with title Datin Paduka Setia Tengku Putra, cousin of Sultan Sharafuddin :
  Knight Grand Companion of the Order of Sultan Sharafuddin Idris Shah (SSIS,12 December 2015) with title Dato' Setia  Knight Companion of the Order of Sultan Salahuddin Abdul Aziz Shah (DSSA, 3 April 1993) with title Dato'  Companion  of the Order of Sultan Salahuddin Abdul Aziz Shah (SSA, 7 September 1985)

 Malaysia, sultanates and states 

 Malaysia 

 Sharafuddin of Selangor :
  Recipient of the Order of the Crown of the Realm (DMN, 8.3.2003)
 Tengku Ahmad Shah, third younger brother of Sultan Sharafuddin
  Knight of the Order of the Royal Household of Malaysia (PSD, 3.6.2000)
 Tengku Zahariah, third sister of Sultan Sharafuddin
  Knight of the Order of the Royal Household of Malaysia (PSD, 3.6.2000)

 Sultanate of Johor 
 Sharafuddin of Selangor :
  First Class of the Royal Family Order of Johor (DK I)
  Knight Grand Commander of the Order of the Crown of Johor (SPMJ, 1975). 
 Tengku Sulaiman Shah, eldest younger brother of Sultan Sharafuddin :
  Knight Grand Commander of the Order of the Crown of Johor (SPMJ)
  Sultan Ibrahim Coronation Medal (PIS)

 Sultanate of Kedah 

 Sharafuddin of Selangor :
  Member of the Royal Family Order of Kedah (DK)

 Sultanate of Kelantan 

 Sharafuddin of Selangor :
  Recipient of the Royal Family Order or Star of Yunus (DK)
 Tengku Amir Shah, Crown Prince of Selangor
  Knight Grand Commander of the Order of the Crown of Kelantan or "Star of Muhammad" (SPMK, 2011) 
 Tengku Sulaiman Shah, eldest younger brother of Sultan Sharafuddin :
  Knight Grand Commander of the Order of the Life of the Crown of Kelantan or Star of Ismail (SJMK)
 Tengku Putra, cousin of Sultan Sharafuddin :
  Knight Commander of the Order of the Life of the Crown of Kelantan or Star of Ismail (DJMK)

 Sultanate of Negeri Sembilan 

 Sharafuddin of Selangor :
  Member of the Royal Family Order of Negeri Sembilan (DKNS, 19.7.2002)
 Tengku Ahmad Shah, third younger brother of Sultan Sharafuddin
  Knight Grand Commande of the Grand Order of Tuanku Ja’afar (SPTJ)

 Sultanate of Pahang 
 Sharafuddin of Selangor :
  Recipient of the Royal Family Order of Perak (DK)

 Sultanate of Perlis 

 Sharafuddin of Selangor :
  Recipient of the Perlis Family Order of the Gallant Prince Syed Putra Jamalullail (DK, 11.12.2005)
 Tengku Nur Zihan, youngest sister of Sultan Sharafuddin
  Knight Commander of the Order of the Gallant Prince Syed Sirajuddin Jamalullail (DSPJ, 1999)

 Sultanate of Terengganu 

 Sharafuddin of Selangor :
  Member first class of the Family Order of Terengganu (DK I)
 Tengku Ahmad Shah, third younger brother of Sultan Sharafuddin
  Member Knight Companion (DSMT), later Member Grand Companion (SSMT) of the Order of Sultan Mahmud I of Terengganu

 Asian honours 

 Far East  to be completed if any Middle East   to be completed if any American  honours to be completed if any European honours 

 France 
 Sharafuddin of Selangor : Commander of the National Order of the Legion of Honourto be completed if any African honours to be completed if any''

References

Notes 

 
Selangor